Panorbis is a genus of fungi in the family Halosphaeriaceae. This is a monotypic genus, containing the single species Panorbis viscosus.

References

External links
Panorbis at Index Fungorum

Microascales
Monotypic Sordariomycetes genera